Mohammad Salsali (born August 28, 1983 in Esfahan, Iran) is an Iranian football player.

Club career

Club career statistics
Last Update  10 May 2013 

 Assist Goals

Honours
Aboomoslem
Hazfi Cup
Runners-up (1): 2004–05
Zob Ahan
AFC Champions League
Runners-up (1): 2010
Iran Pro League
Runners-up (2): 2008–09, 2009–10
Hazfi Cup (1): 2008–09

External links
Persian League Profile

Iranian footballers
Association football defenders
Zob Ahan Esfahan F.C. players
Persian Gulf Pro League players
Azadegan League players
Sportspeople from Isfahan
1983 births
Living people